The London and North Eastern Railway (LNER) Thompson Class L1 was a class of 2-6-4T steam locomotives designed by Edward Thompson.  The prototype no. 9000 was built in 1945, but the remaining 99 were built under British Railways jurisdiction in the period 1948–1950.

Overview
The class, at least on paper, should have been very free steaming and powerful engines but, in practice, they were not suited to the work to which they were assigned. The engines had  driving wheels, which would give them excellent power at low speed, such as that required for freight work, but these engines were intended for passenger use. The speeds required for suburban passenger work wore the engines out in a remarkably short time.  Axleboxes, crosshead slides and crank bearings all suffered due to the high speeds.

Accidents and incidents
On 19 November 1958, a freight train overran signals and was in a rear-end collision with another at Hitchin, Hertfordshire. A third freight train ran into the wreckage and was derailed. Locomotive No. 67785 was pushed over by the wagons from the third train.

Modifications
In an attempt to reduce wear, two experiments were tried. Neither experiment was a success.

Numbering

Withdrawal
Withdrawals were between 1960 and 1962. None survived to preservation.

Modelling

Hornby produces the L1 class in 00 gauge with a number of different liveries, both green with LNER or BR running numbers, and black with BR running numbers.

References

L1
2-6-4T locomotives
Railway locomotives introduced in 1945
Scrapped locomotives
NBL locomotives
Robert Stephenson and Hawthorns locomotives
Standard gauge steam locomotives of Great Britain